The year 1990 in architecture involved some significant architectural events and new buildings.

Events
Caruso St John architectural practice established in the U.K. by Adam Caruso and Peter St John.

Buildings and structures

Atatürk Dam in Turkey is completed
Scotia Tower (Montreal) in Montreal, Canada
Bank of China Tower, Hong Kong, designed by I. M. Pei, is completed and becomes the tallest building in the British Commonwealth (1990-1992).
Messeturm in Frankfurt, is completed and becomes the tallest building in the European Union (1990-1997).
U.S. Bank Tower in Los Angeles, designed by architectural firm Pei Cobb Freed & Partners, is completed.
Two Prudential Plaza in Chicago is completed.
Scripps Center in Cincinnati is completed.
Basilica of Our Lady of Peace of Yamoussoukro in Ivory Coast, designed by Pierre Fakhoury, is consecrated as one of the world's largest churches.
The Round Building at Hathersage in the Peak District of England, for David Mellor (cutler), designed by Michael Hopkins, is built.
Construction of the Washington National Cathedral is completed.

Awards
American Academy of Arts and Letters Gold Medal – Kevin Roche.
AIA Gold Medal – E. Fay Jones.
Architecture Firm Award – Kohn Pedersen Fox Associates.
European Union Prize for Contemporary Architecture (Mies van der Rohe Prize) – Sir Norman Foster for New Stansted Airport Terminal, London.
Grand Prix de l'urbanisme – Jean-François Revert.
Grand Prix national de l'architecture – Francis Soler.
Praemium Imperiale Architecture Laureate – James Stirling.
Pritzker Prize – Aldo Rossi.
RAIA Gold Medal – Peter McIntyre.
RIBA Royal Gold Medal – Aldo van Eyck.
Twenty-five Year Award – Gateway Arch.
UIA Gold Medal – Charles Correa.

Deaths
April 20 – Arnold Alas, Estonian soldier and architect (born 1911)
 August 6 – Gordon Bunshaft, American architect (born 1909)
 June 19 – Steen Eiler Rasmussen, Danish architect (born 1898)
 December 24 – Judith Ledeboer, Dutch-born English architect (born 1901)
 December 31 – Giovanni Michelucci, Italian architect (born 1891)

References

 
20th-century architecture